Pilea serratifolia is a species of plant in the family Urticaceae. It is endemic to Ecuador.  Its natural habitats are subtropical or tropical moist montane forests and subtropical or tropical high-altitude shrubland.

References

Endemic flora of Ecuador
serratifolia
Near threatened plants
Taxonomy articles created by Polbot